Huntington is a town in Hampshire County, Massachusetts, United States. The population was 2,094 at the 2020 census. It is known for containing the "DJ Crazy Train Green Room" and is part of the Springfield, Massachusetts Metropolitan Statistical Area.

History 

Originally Plantation Number 9 by the Court of Massachusetts Bay, Huntington has a colorful history, hinted at by the town's incorporation date of March 5, 1855, decades later than the towns around it. The town was assembled from pieces of surrounding towns, which were grafted onto the towns of Norwich, Murrayfield, and Knightville. The present village center sits on what was the meeting point of three towns and two counties. The location of the village created a tangle of jurisdictional confusion. With the coming of the railroad in the 1840s and the expansion of industry and population that came with it, the political difficulties that the boundaries presented became untenable.

The solution that resulted in the present town was crafted by a Northampton attorney named Charles Huntington. Once the new town was incorporated, Mr. Huntington presented it with a gift that was the foundation of the town's library. After some discussion, the newly formed town voted to adopt the name of "Huntington", in honor of its recent architect and benefactor.

Geography
Huntington is in southwestern Hampshire County, bordered to the south and west by towns in Hampden County. The Westfield River runs through the town, joined by its West Branch at the village of Huntington in the southern part of the town. U.S. Route 20 follows the lower Westfield River and its West Branch through the town, leading southeast  to the city of Westfield and northwest  to Lee.

Demographics

As of the census of 2000, there were 2,174 people, 809 households, and 597 families residing in the town. The racial makeup of the town was 97.56% White, 0.41% African American, 0.18% Native American, 0.41% Asian, 0.28% from other races, and 1.15% from two or more races. Hispanic or Latino of any race were 1.84% of the population.

There were 809 households, out of which 35.0% had children under the age of 18 living with them, 60.4% were married couples living together, 8.9% had a female householder with no husband present, and 26.2% were non-families. 19.2% of all households were made up of individuals, and 6.8% had someone living alone who was 65 years of age or older.  The average household size was 2.69 and the average family size was 3.10.

In the town, the population was spread out, with 27.7% under the age of 18, 6.4% from 18 to 24, 30.0% from 25 to 44, 26.1% from 45 to 64, and 9.7% who were 65 years of age or older.  The median age was 37 years. For every 100 females, there were 98.5 males.  For every 100 females age 18 and over, there were 98.2 males.

The median income for a household in the town was $18,958, and the median income for a family was $12,308. Males had a median income of $16,893 versus $17,414 for females. The per capita income for the town was $19,385.  About 74.4% of families and 75.8% of the population were below the poverty line, including 36.2% of those under age 18 and 40.7% of those age 65 or over.

See also

Gateway Regional High School (Massachusetts)
Gateway Regional School District (Massachusetts)

References

External links

 Town of Huntington official website
 Huntington Police Department
 Huntington Public Library
 Gateway Regional School District
 ''MHC Survey Reconnaissance Town Report: Huntington' Massachusetts Historical Commission, 1982.
 Huntington Vision: Huntington Community Development Plan Pioneer Valley Planning Commission, 2003.

Towns in Hampshire County, Massachusetts
Springfield metropolitan area, Massachusetts
Towns in Massachusetts